Ammonius pupulus is a species of Central African brushed trapdoor spiders. It is the only species in the genus Ammonius . It was  first described by Tamerlan Thorell in 1899, and has only been found in Cameroon.

References

Endemic fauna of Cameroon
Barychelidae
Spiders of Africa
Spiders described in 1899